The Kerala Sahitya Akademi Award for Story is an award given every year by the Kerala Sahitya Akademi (Kerala Literary Academy) to Malayalam writers for writing a story of literary merit. It is one of the twelve categories of the Kerala Sahitya Akademi Award.

Awardees

References

Awards established in 1966
Kerala Sahitya Akademi Awards
Malayalam literary awards
Short story awards
1966 establishments in Kerala